Louis DiGiaimo (1938 – December 19, 2015) was an American casting director and film producer. He was one of the casting directors of Francis Ford Coppola's The Godfather and went on to help cast multiple films each for directors William Friedkin, Barry Levinson and Ridley Scott. He also produced Mike Newell's Donnie Brasco alongside Levinson and, in 1998, he won the Primetime Emmy Award for Outstanding Casting for a Drama Series for Levinson's television series Homicide: Life on the Street.

Biography

Early life and career
DiGiaimo spent his childhood in Paterson, New Jersey. He graduated from Fairleigh Dickinson University and worked as an accountant before embarking on a career as a casting director. His big break came in 1968 when he met director Martin Ritt, who was preparing to shoot the mafia drama The Brotherhood, starring Kirk Douglas. DiGiaimo's manner in seeking out both actors and non-actors for The Brotherhood impressed Ritt, and the director hired him to work on the film. DiGiaimo went on to make his debut as a principal casting director on a far more successful mafia picture, Francis Ford Coppola's Academy Award-winning The Godfather.

In between The Brotherhood and The Godfather, DiGiaimo worked with director William Friedkin for the first time on The French Connection, though his work on the film went uncredited. He reunited with Friedkin soon thereafter, this time as a principal casting director on the renowned horror hit The Exorcist. DiGiaimo cast several more films, including the 1975 releases Breakheart Pass and Farewell, My Lovely, before reteaming with Friedkin for The Brink's Job and yet again for Cruising. He was also casting director on Brian G. Hutton's The First Deadly Sin, which features Frank Sinatra in his last starring role.

Collaborations with Barry Levinson
DiGiaimo's first collaboration with Barry Levinson was on the 1984 baseball drama The Natural, for which DiGiaimo provided additional casting services. Levinson later recruited DiGiaimo as the primary casting director of his films Tin Men, Good Morning, Vietnam, Rain Man, Jimmy Hollywood, and Sleepers. DiGiaimo also handled additional casting on Levinson's Avalon.

When Levinson was developing the drama series Homicide: Life on the Street for NBC, he brought in DiGiaimo to handle the casting. For his work on Homicide, DiGiaimo received three consecutive Primetime Emmy Award nominations for Outstanding Casting for a Drama Series, winning the award in 1998. DiGiaimo and Levinson also worked together as producers on Mike Newell's crime drama Donnie Brasco (for which DiGiaimo was also casting director) and the Levinson-directed An Everlasting Piece.

Reuniting with Friedkin, collaborations with Ridley Scott, and more
Ten years after they last worked together on Cruising, DiGiaimo and Friedkin reteamed again for the director's 1990 horror film The Guardian. DiGiaimo also returned to the Exorcist franchise that year (albeit without Friedkin) as casting director of The Exorcist III, written and directed by the original film's writer, William Peter Blatty. Friedkin enlisted DiGiaimo's services one last time for the 1994 basketball drama Blue Chips.

Ridley Scott first called upon DiGiaimo to help him cast his 1991 film Thelma & Louise. For this film, it was DiGiaimo who pushed for a then-relatively unknown Brad Pitt to be cast in the role of J.D. Pitt landed the part, and his work in the film helped jump-start his career. The success of this initial union led to DiGiaimo casting Scott's next five films: 1492: Conquest of Paradise, White Squall, G.I. Jane, the Academy Award-winning Gladiator, and Hannibal.

Other directors whose movies DiGiaimo helped cast include John Frankenheimer (52 Pick-Up), Luis Llosa (Sniper), Brian Gibson (The Juror), Sidney Lumet (Gloria), Luis Mandoki (Trapped), and Richard Donner (16 Blocks). He also produced Bob Giraldi's independent film Dinner Rush. His final film as casting director was Nick Stagliano's Good Day for It, released in 2011.

Death
A 42-year resident of  Oakland, New Jersey, DiGiaimo died there on December 19, 2015, due to complications from a stroke. He was 77 years old.

Filmography
He was a producer in all films unless otherwise noted.

Film

As casting director

Casting department

Television

As casting director

References

External links

1938 births
2015 deaths
American casting directors
People from Oakland, New Jersey
People from Paterson, New Jersey